The Ten Million Club Foundation is a non-governmental organization based in the Netherlands which promotes global overpopulation awareness. For the Netherlands, it advocates to match the population size with the carrying capacity of the area. Initially, the foundation was calling for a shrinking population; later on the emphasis was also put on a reduction of the ecological footprint of the inhabitants of the Netherlands. The club was set up as a private foundation by the Dutch historian Paul Gerbrands in 1994.

10 million inhabitants 
As the Ten Million Club was founded, the Netherlands counted over 15 million inhabitants. The Club argued for a target number of 10 million people instead, as was the situation in 1950. However, measurements of the ecological footprint of the Dutch revealed that this number was still far too high, given the population's consumption and pollution level. According to recent calculations of the Global Footprint Network the Dutch are using 6,2 times more global hectares than their country provides. With an actual population of more than 17 million people this would amount to a sustainable population of just 2,7 million people. A huge part of this overshoot is caused by the carbon footprint of the Dutch. A rapid transition to renewable energy as well as a substantial reduction of consumption could make a higher number of inhabitants possible, without the necessity to rely on or even exploit other countries.

Overpopulation as a global problem 
Calculations of the ecological footprint of all countries in the world show exactly where the biocapacity and the available global hectares of a country are exceeded. The Ten Million Club considers population pressure an essential cause of this overshoot. The global overshoot problem cannot properly be solved by a mere reduction of consumption levels. If we would accept a Human Development Index (HDI) of 7.0 - which is the present HDI of countries as Egypt or Indonesia - for all people in the world, with the corresponding ecological footprint, then many countries would still exceed their bocapacity. Given the global impact of overpopulation, the Club does not only address the Dutch; it has published in Spanish, French, German, English, Portuguese, Chinese, Arabic and Russian.
In 2021 the foundation changed its name into 'OverBevolking', stressing the priority of overpopulation in The Netherlands as its main concern.

Overpopulation awareness 
The Ten Million Club tries to raise public awareness of overpopulation as a national and international problem by providing information on the drawbacks of population pressure. The club maintains an international website with several articles on overpopulation. It publishes a newsletter three times a year,   gives lectures and supports students writing a thesis on the subject. The foundation also maintains a presence on Facebook. In a 10 minutes documentary titled "Overpopulation in Europe: Can we survive?" the Ten Million Club highlights different aspects of overpopulation as well as its detrimental consequences.

References

External links 
Overpopulation awareness website of the foundation

Additional References 
 Jos Klaassen, ‘Een boodschap met een lastig thema’ ('An inconvenient message'), de Volkskrant, 16 March 2002
 RTL 4, Chairman Paul Gerbrands in a national talk show, 7 March 2003 
 Martin Sommer, 'De man van tien miljoen’ ('The ten million man'), de Volkskrant, 18 September 2003
 Jan H. van de Beek, Kennis, macht en moraal – De productie van wetenschappelijke kennis over de economische effecten van migratie naar Nederland 1960 – 2005 (Knowledge, power and morality: the production of scientific knowledge on migration into the Netherlands 1960 – 2005), Amsterdam: Vossiuspers - Amsterdam University Press, 2010
 Rutger Bregman, ‘Hoeveel mensheid kan een aarde aan?’ ('How many humans can an earth accommodate?'), De Correspondent, 28 January 2014
 RTL Nieuws, Editie NL: Gefeliciteerd, jij bent de 17 miljoenste Nederlander ('Congrats, you're the 17 millionth Dutchman'), Commercial TV Channel, 4 March 2016
 René van Zwieten, 'Uitslag stelling: "Nederland raakt erg vol"' ('Poll results: The Netherlands are becoming overcrowded'), De Telegraaf, 7 March 2016
 Paul Gerbrands, ‘Politici, spreek je uit over dreigende overbevolking’ ('Politicians, speak out about imminent overpopulation'), Trouw, 9 March 2016
 Nieuwstrend: Nederland telt nu 17 miljoen inwoners ('The Netherlands count 17 million inhabitants right now') Dutch public broadcast, 21 March 2016
 Radio 1: De bevolking in Nederland groeit te hard ('The Dutch population is growing too fast'), Dutch public broadcast, 2 August 2016
 Paul Gerbrands, 'Mother Nature's revenge', The Oslo Times, 23 February 2017
 Daniël van Dam, 'Bevolking door het dak' ('[Dutch] population through the ceiling'), De Telegraaf, 31 October 2017
 Jeroen Haverkort, 'Geen kinderen omdat de wereld te vol raakt' ('No kids because the world gets overcrowded'), Metro, 1 November 2017
Amarins de Boer, 'Als we zo doorgaan, is Nederland straks overspoeld' ('If we go on like this, The Netherlands will be flooded'), Metro, 19 December 2017
Lisa Peters & Marlies Pilon, 'We moeten praten over baby's, bevolkingspolitiek en bemoeizucht' ('We have to talk about babies, population policy and meddling'), OneWorld, 29 June 2018
Jan van Weeren, 'Er is straks veel te weinig eten voor al die mensen' ('Soon there will be far too little food for all those people'), de Volkskrant, 5 July 2018
Remco Meijer, 'Terug op de politieke agenda: met hoeveel willen we zijn in Nederland?' ('Back on the political agenda: with how many people do we want to share The Netherlands?'), de Volkskrant, 20 September 2018
Carl-Eric Rasch, 'Met hoeveel we in Nederland willen en kunnen zijn kan niet langer los worden gezien van immigratie' ('A discussion of a preferred and viable population of The Netherlands can no longer be separated from the immigration problem'), Trouw, 6 October 2018
Jan van Weeren, 'Whose freedom of choice?', The Overpopulation Project, 2018
Chris Paulussen, 'Paul Gerbrands over toename van de wereldbevolking: "De menselijke maat is zoek"' ('Paul Gerbrands on world population growth: "the human scale has gone"'), Algemeen Dagblad, 29 December 2019
Jan van Weeren, 'From bodily autonomy back to family planning', The Overpopulation Project, 2021
Caspar van de Poel, 'Strikt ecologisch gezien passen in Nederland maar 1 of 2 miljoen mensen' ('Strict ecologically The Netherlands can only accommodate 1 or 2 million people'), de Kanttekening, 9 December 2021

Environmental organisations based in the Netherlands
Environmental organizations established in 1994
Organizations promoting population moderation